A Lot of Little Lies for the Sake of One Big Truth is an EP by Canadian indie rock band Stars, released in 2001 on Le Grand Magistery Records.

It contains two tracks from the band's debut album Nightsongs, two live versions of tracks from that album, and two bonus tracks.

Track listing
All songs by Stars, except "This Charming Man" by Morrissey and Johnny Marr.

2001 EPs
Stars (Canadian band) albums